"Million Dollar Bill" is a song performed by American recording artist Whitney Houston from her seventh studio album, I Look to You (2009). It was released as the official worldwide lead (second in the US) single from the album on August 18, 2009, through Arista Records in the US and August 24, 2009, through RCA Records in the UK. It is Houston's final single from a studio album, and the last song released in her lifetime before her death in 2012. The song samples R&B singer Loleatta Holloway's "We're Getting Stronger", co-written by Norman Harris.

Background
"Million Dollar Bill" was written by singer-songwriter Alicia Keys and samples R&B singer Loleatta Holloway's "We're Getting Stronger" from Holloway's 1976 'Loleatta' LP. Houston said to MTV News: 

The song was produced by Keys with hip-hop producer and husband Swizz Beatz producing an old school R&B beat. Beatz told MTV News that the process on the song started when he got a call from Clive Davis and record executive Larry Jackson.

The song received praise at the album's listening parties and was cited as a "big comeback record". Houston performed the song live on The X Factor in the UK on Sunday, October 18 the night before the album was released in that territory.

Composition

Million Dollar Bill has an uptempo "pop dance groove" with strong disco influences. The song lasts for three minutes and twenty four seconds. Written in they key of B Minor, the song's beat is set in common time and moves at a tempo of 120 beats per minute. Houston's voice spans A3 to the note of B4. The song also features a sample of Loleatta Holloway's 1977 song "We're Getting Stronger (The Longer We Stay Together)".

Critical reception
From the New York listening party, Rolling Stone said the song "is a clattering, uptempo hip-hop-inspired number. It may be the fastest ever for Houston, who keeps up nicely. It received a standing ovation setting the tone for much of the album." Dean Piper of the Daily Mirror considered it a "summer track" reminiscent of Janet Jackson's "The Best Things in Life Are Free."

Nick Levine of Digital Spy said the song is a "midtempo disco track with an unabashedly feelgood message" and a "classy, dignified and thoroughly likeable comeback effort", while Houston's voice "is deeper and raspier than you might remember, but she's still capable of going for a money note". Bill Lamb of About.com rated the song 3.5 stars out of five in a mixed review, saying that "the performance is undeniably the Whitney Houston we all know" and Keys "has written a song that fits very well with her tradition of 'old soul' songs", but with the "very old school R&B" approach from Beatz it is "all almost too familiar" and "Houston failed to give it a new twist that would successfully make the old stunningly new again." Gail Mitchell of Billboard wrote: "this club jam practically screams remix. Produced by Alicia Keys and Swizz Beatz, it's accented by a catchy hook on which Houston emphatically notes, "If he makes you feel like a million dollar bill, say it."

Chart performance
The success of "Million Dollar Bill" in the United States was described as "modest".
The song entered the Billboard Hot 100 at number 100 on the issue date September 19, 2009, dropping  out of the chart the following week.
The single marked Houston's lowest peak on the chart in her career.
It fared better on the R&B/Hip-Hop Songs chart. "Million Dollar Bill" spent 30 weeks there, peaking at number 16 on the issue date December 19, 2009.
This was Houston's longest run on the chart since her 1999 single "It's Not Right but It's Okay". It was also Houston's highest peak since "Same Script, Different Cast", which was released in 2000.
The song topped the Adult R&B Songs chart for two weeks on December 19, 2009, and December 26, 2009. It lasted 12 weeks on the Dance/Club Play Songs chart, topping the chart on November 7, 2009. It brought her total of number-ones on the chart to 13. It is also her longest run and her highest peak on the chart since 2003's "Love That Man".
In addition to America, "Million Dollar Bill" also spent five weeks on the Billboard Canadian Hot 100, peaking at 62 on September 19, 2009.

"Million Dollar Bill" first appeared on the UK Singles Chart, in the week of October 17, 2009, placing at number 12.  The Freemasons remix was promoted.
Going into its third week on October 31, 2009, the song reached number-five in the same week it peaked at number-two on the R&B chart.
This made the single Houston's highest position on the chart in over ten years ("My Love Is Your Love", number-two, July 3, 1999).
It remained on the chart for 14 consecutive weeks. On January 23, 2010, it re-entered the chart at #95, then dropped out the next week.
This 15-week chart run was Houston's longest run since 1999's "It's Not Right but It's Okay", also 15 weeks.
The song re-entered on the week of February 25, 2012, following Houston's death. It charted at number 62.
"Million Dollar Bill" entered the UK Top 40 R&B Singles chart at number-seven on October 17, 2009.
It went on to last 20 weeks, its last entry dated February 27, 2010 (number 32).

The single charted in other European countries. "Million Dollar Bill" entered the Irish Singles Chart on October 8, 2009, at number 45.
After four weeks on the chart, it peaked at number-eight.
It spent ten weeks on the Irish charts.
Released as a double A-side in Germany with "I Look to You",
It spent eight weeks on their singles chart (October 19 – December 13, 2009). It peaked at 41. It's her longest run in Germany since 1999's "I Learned from the Best" and her highest position since 1993's "I Have Nothing".
It also spent five weeks on the Dutch Single Top 100, peaking on September 12, 2009, at number 58. It's her longest run in the Netherlands since 2003's "One of Those Days" and her highest position since 2002's "Whatchulookinat".
"Million Dollar Bill" debuted on the Swiss Singles Top 75 at number 40 and remained in the chart for two weeks after (September 13–27, 2009).
In Sweden, it entered the Singles Top 60 at number 22. It steadily fell for the next four weeks. It was Houston's highest position there since 2000's "Could I Have This Kiss Forever".
The single placed on Belgium's charts as well. It lasted on Ultratip Flanders for five weeks, peaking at number-six; additionally, it lasted on Ultratip Wallonia for seven weeks, peaking at number-three.
"Million Dollar Bill" lasted one week and two weeks in Finland (peaked at number 18) and Italy (peaked at number 15) respectively.

The track also made appearances on "end-of-year" charts as well. In the United Kingdom, the song finished 2009 on the year-end singles chart at number 90.
In America, "Million Dollar Bill" placed in two charts from two different years. It landed at number 25 for the Dance/Club Play Songs in 2009.
A year later, it placed at 81 for the R&B/Hip-Hop Songs chart.

Music video

The music video for 'Million Dollar Bill' was directed by Melina Matsoukas (who directed the music video for Houston's previous song "I Look to You"), known for working with artists such as Kylie Minogue, Beyoncé, Lady Gaga and Ciara. It premiered on Houston's official website on September 16, 2009.

The video featured Houston entering a dry cleaners and making her way through a kitchen wearing a fur coat. On exiting the kitchen, the music begins, and she walks into a night club with her then removing her coat and singing on a small stage. Throughout the video, Houston is seen in several different outfits, including a metallic dress and knee high boots, and, as the video progresses, a pink dress and a full-length silver dress. The video concludes as Houston is walking away in the silver dress, with dollar bills blowing around.

Track listings and formats

German double A-side single
"I Look to You" – 4:25
"Million Dollar Bill" – 3:24

UK and Europe CD single
"Million Dollar Bill" (album version) – 3:24
"Million Dollar Bill" (Freemasons Radio Mix) – 3:48

US CD single
"Million Dollar Bill" (album version) – 3:24
"Million Dollar Bill" (instrumental) – 3:21

Australian CD single
"Million Dollar Bill" (album version) – 3:25
"Million Dollar Bill" (instrumental) – 3:22
"Million Dollar Bill" (call out hook) – 0:14

Poland CD single (Freemasons remixes)
"Million Dollar Bill" (Freemasons Radio Mix) – 3:48
"Million Dollar Bill" (Freemasons Club Mix) – 8:10
"Million Dollar Bill" (Freemasons Mixshow) – 4:45	

US and UK album remixes (EP 1)
"Million Dollar Bill" (Freemasons Radio Mix) – 3:49
"Million Dollar Bill" (Frankie Knuckles Radio Mix) – 3:15
"I Look to You" (Johnny Vicious Warehouse Radio Mix) – 4:08
"I Look to You" (Johnny Vicious Club Radio Mix) – 3:52
"I Didn't Know My Own Strength" (Peter Rauhofer Radio Edit) – 3:04
"I Didn't Know My Own Strength" (Daddy's Groove Magic Island Radio Mix) – 3:11
"I Look to You" (Christian Dio Radio Mix) – 4:01
"I Look to You" (Giuseppe D. Tune Adiks Radio Edit) – 3:47

UK and US single remixes (EP 2)
"Million Dollar Bill" (Freemasons Radio Mix) – 3:49
"Million Dollar Bill" (Freemasons Club Mix) – 8:10
"Million Dollar Bill" (Freemasons Mixshow) – 5:00
"Million Dollar Bill" (Frankie Knuckles Radio Mix) – 3:15
"Million Dollar Bill" (Frankie Knuckles Club Mix) – 7:08
"Million Dollar Bill" (Frankie Knuckles Dub Mix) – 6:59

Personnel

Credits
Mixing – Tony Maserati
Engineering assistance and mixing – Christian Baker, Miki Tsutsumi, Val Brathwaite
Production – Alicia Keys, Swizz Beatz
Vocal production and arrangement – Alicia Keys
Programming – Swizz Beatz
Recording engineer – Ann Mincieli
Writing – Alicia Keys, Kasseem Dean, Norman Harris

Sample
"We're Getting Stronger" by Loleatta Holloway
Sample writers – Allan Felder, Norman Harris, Ronald Tyson

Recording and mixing
Recorded and engineered in New York City at the Oven Studios and Germano Studios
Mixed for Two Chord Music Inc. at Oven Studios, New York City.

Charts and certifications

Weekly charts

Year-end charts

Certifications and sales

Release history

See also
 List of number-one dance singles of 2009 (U.S.)

References

2009 singles
Whitney Houston songs
Song recordings produced by Swizz Beatz
Songs written by Alicia Keys
Music videos directed by Melina Matsoukas
Songs written by Swizz Beatz
2009 songs
Arista Records singles
Dance-pop songs
Disco songs
Funk songs